Uncle Arthur may refer to:

 Uncle Arthur, pen name of prolific Seventh-day Adventist Church author Arthur S. Maxwell
 Uncle Arthur, a recurring character played by Paul Lynde on the television comedy series Bewitched.
 Uncle Arthur, a minor character from the television show The Simpsons; Simpson family#Extended Bouvier family
 Uncle Arthur, a character played by Australian comedian Glenn Robbins
 Uncle Arthur, a song published in 1967 by musician David Bowie
 Uncle Arthur, the name used by Private Frank Pike for Sergeant Arthur Wilson in British sitcom Dad's Army
 Uncle Arthur, the name in Dublin of a pint of Guinness stout; or referring to the brewery's founder Arthur Guinness (1725-1803)